Agonopterix chironiella is a moth of the family Depressariidae. It is found in Portugal, Spain, France, Italy and on Sicily.

The wingspan is 24–27 mm.

The larvae feed on Opoponax chironium.

References

Moths described in 1893
Agonopterix
Moths of Europe